The 1984–85 Bundesliga was the 22nd season of the Bundesliga, the premier football league in West Germany. It began on 24 August 1984 and ended on 8 June 1985. VfB Stuttgart were the defending champions.

Competition modus
Every team played two games against each other team, one at home and one away. Teams received two points for a win and one point for a draw. If two or more teams were tied on points, places were determined by goal difference and, if still tied, by goals scored. The team with the most points were crowned champions while the two teams with the fewest points were relegated to 2. Bundesliga. The third-to-last team had to compete in a two-legged relegation/promotion play-off against the third-placed team from 2. Bundesliga.

Team changes to 1983–84
Kickers Offenbach and 1. FC Nürnberg were directly relegated to the 2. Bundesliga after finishing in the last two places. They were replaced by Karlsruher SC and FC Schalke 04. Relegation/promotion play-off participant Eintracht Frankfurt won on aggregate against MSV Duisburg and thus retained their Bundesliga status.

Season overview

Team overview

 Waldhof Mannheim played their matches in nearby Ludwigshafen because their own ground did not fulfil Bundesliga requirements.

League table

Results

Relegation play-offs
Arminia Bielefeld and third-placed 2. Bundesliga team 1. FC Saarbrücken had to compete in a two-legged relegation/promotion play-off. Saarbrücken won 3–1 on aggregate and thus were promoted to the Bundesliga.

Top goalscorers
26 goals
  Klaus Allofs (1. FC Köln)

25 goals
  Rudi Völler (SV Werder Bremen)

19 goals
  Karl Allgöwer (VfB Stuttgart)
  Thomas Allofs (1. FC Kaiserslautern)

18 goals
  Siegfried Reich (Arminia Bielefeld)
  Klaus Täuber (FC Schalke 04)

17 goals
  Günter Thiele (Fortuna Düsseldorf)

16 goals
  Klaus Fischer (VfL Bochum)
  Pierre Littbarski (1. FC Köln)
  Lothar Matthäus (FC Bayern Munich)
  Frank Mill (Borussia Mönchengladbach)

Champion squad

See also
 1984–85 2. Bundesliga
 1984–85 DFB-Pokal

References

External links
 DFB Bundesliga archive 1984/1985

Bundesliga seasons
1
Germany